George Henry FitzRoy, 4th Duke of Grafton, KG (14 January 1760 – 28 September 1844), styled Earl of Euston until 1811, was a British peer and Whig politician who sat in the House of Commons from 1782 to 1811 when he succeeded to the Dukedom.

Early life
Euston was the son of Augustus FitzRoy, 3rd Duke of Grafton, and his wife, Anne Lidell. He was educated at Harrow School and Trinity College, Cambridge, where he became a close friend of the William Pitt the Younger. He married Lady Charlotte Maria Waldegrave (1761–1808), daughter of James Waldegrave, 2nd Earl Waldegrave, on 16 November 1784 at Navestock, Essex.

Political career
From 1782 to 1784, Euston was Member of Parliament for Thetford, and in 1784, he and Pitt were elected as MPs for Cambridge University. Euston held that seat until he succeeded his father in the dukedom in 1811. He was appointed a deputy lieutenant of Northamptonshire on 9 May 1803. 

Euston used his position in parliament to advocate for Britain having friendly relations with the newly created United States.

He was appointed Knight, Order of the Garter (K.G.) in 1834.

Family
Grafton  died on 28 September 1844 and was succeeded by his son Henry. He and his wife Charlotte had eleven children:
 Lady Maria (Mary) Anne (1785–1855), married Sir William Oglander, 6th Baronet and had issue.
 Lady Georgiana (1787–1855), unmarried
 Lady Elizabeth Anne (1788–1867), married her first cousin John Henry Smyth and had issue.
 Henry, styled Earl of Euston, later 5th Duke of Grafton (1790–1863)
 Lord Charles FitzRoy (1791–1865), married Lady Anne Cavendish (daughter of George Cavendish, 1st Earl of Burlington) and had issue.
 Lady Isabella Frances (1792–1875), married Henry Joseph St. John (died 1857)
 Lord William FitzRoy (1794–1804)
 Lord Hugh George FitzRoy (1795–1797)
 Lord Richard FitzRoy (1798–1798)
 Lord Richard FitzRoy (1800–1801)
 Lord James FitzRoy (1804–1834)

References

External links 

 

1760 births
1844 deaths
People educated at Harrow School
Alumni of Trinity College, Cambridge
Children of prime ministers of the United Kingdom
Deputy Lieutenants of Northamptonshire
104
Earls of Arlington
House of Stuart
Garter Knights appointed by William IV
Lord-Lieutenants of Suffolk
Euston, George FitzRoy, Earl of
Euston, George
Euston, George FitzRoy, Earl of
Euston, George FitzRoy, Earl of
Euston, George FitzRoy, Earl of
Euston, George FitzRoy, Earl of
UK MPs who inherited peerages
George FitzRoy, 4th Duke of Grafton
Members of the Parliament of Great Britain for Cambridge University
Owners of Epsom Derby winners
British MPs 1780–1784
British MPs 1784–1790
British MPs 1790–1796
British MPs 1796–1800